Benz, an old Germanic clan name dating to the fifth century (related to "bear", "war banner", "gau", or a "land by a waterway") also used in German as an alternative for names such as Berthold, Bernhard, or Benedict, may refer to:

People

Surname
 Amy Benz (born 1962), American golfer
 Bertha Benz (1849–1944), German marketing entrepreneur who was the first to drive an automobile for a long distance, wife of Carl Benz
 Carl Benz (1844–1929), German engineer, inventor, and entrepreneur who built the first patented automobile
 Derek Benz (born 1971), American author of fantasy fiction for children
 Edward J. Benz, Jr., professor of genetics
 Joe Benz (1886–1957), American Major League Baseball pitcher
 Joseph Benz (born 1944), Swiss former bobsledder, Olympic and world champion
 Julie Benz (born 1972), American actress
 Kafi Benz (born 1941), American author, artist, and environmental and historic preservationist
 Larry Benz (born 1941), American former National Football League player
 Laura Benz (born 1992), Swiss ice hockey player
 Maria Benz (1906–1946), birth name of Nusch Éluard, German-born model who married Paul Éluard
 Mathilde Benz (1901–1977), birth name of Lee Parry, German actress
 Paul Benz (born 1986), Australian Paralympic athlete
 Richard Benz (1884–1966), German historian and writer
 Roland Benz (born 1943), German biophysicist
 Sara Benz (born 1992), Swiss ice hockey player
 Walter Benz (1931–2017), German mathematician known for his work on geometric planes 
 Wolfgang Benz (born 1941), German historian

Ring or stage name
 Nicky Benz (born 1980), ring name of Nick Berk, American wrestler
 Nikki Benz (born 1981), stage name of Alla Montchak, Canadian pornographic actress and director
 Spragga Benz (born 1969), stage name of Carlton Grant, Jamaican deejay and musician

Places 
 Benz (Usedom), Mecklenburg-Vorpommern, Germany, a municipality
 Benz, Nordwestmecklenburg, Mecklenburg-Vorpommern, Germany, a municipality
 Benice, West Pomeranian Voivodeship (Benz in German), Poland, a village
 Benz Pass, Trinity Peninsula, Antarctica

Mathematics and science
 Benz (unit), a proposed unit of velocity
 Benz, an abbreviated form of Benzo, a functional group in chemistry
 Benz plane, in geometry

Other uses
 Benz & Cie., a manufacturer of steam engines co-founded by Carl Benz in 1883
 Benz (group), a British band
 Benz series, a series of paintings and drawings created by Lyonel Feininger

See also
 Benzz, the "Calabria" sampling West London drill rapper known for "Je M'appelle"
 Bendz, a surname